Ra's al Ghul is a supervillain appearing in American comic books published by DC Comics, commonly as an adversary of the superhero Batman. Created by editor Julius Schwartz, writer Dennis O'Neil and artist Neal Adams, the character first appeared in Batman #232's "Daughter of the Demon" (June 1971).

Most notable as the leader of the League of Assassins, Ra's al Ghul's name in Arabic translates to "Head of the Ghoul". He is the son of Sensei; the father of Talia al Ghul, Nyssa Raatko and Dusan al Ghul; and the maternal grandfather of Damian Wayne. Stories featuring Ra's al Ghul often involve the Lazarus Pits, which restore life to the dying. The Lazarus Pits have considerably prolonged Ra's' life, making him particularly dangerous as he has honed his combat skills for centuries. Given his high status, he has also come into conflict with Superman and other heroes.

Ra's al Ghul has been featured in various media adaptations. The character was portrayed by David Warner in the DC Animated Universe, Liam Neeson in The Dark Knight Trilogy, Jason Isaacs in Batman: Under the Red Hood, Dee Bradley Baker in the Batman: Arkham video game series, Matt Nable in the Arrowverse television series, and Alexander Siddig in Gotham.

IGN's list of the Top 100 Comic Book Villains of All Time List ranked Ra's as No. 7.

Publication history
Created by editor Julius Schwartz, writer Dennis O'Neil and artist Neal Adams, he was introduced in Batman #232's "Daughter of the Demon" (June 1971). Adams discussed how he designed the character in a 2007 Wizard interview "First of all, Denny O'Neil started as a journalist, and so his experience with costume characters was always a forced experience.  When the idea came to Julie Schwartz that "we're kind of reviving old characters.  What do we want to do for a new character?"  Denny's tendency - and I understood it totally - was not to go to a costumed character with superpowers, but to go to a Moriarty type.  When Denny presented it, here I was as a comic book artist who was used to doing fairly realistic stuff having to deal with, "Hey, no costume."  How do I make him unique?  Because after all, we are pandering to our audience a little bit.  How does he become unique?  So I sort of went down the list of things that I could do that didn't offend my sensibilities as an artist and as a person that lived in the world.  How do you make a person unique?  And then I realized there are people that look unique, that present their personality with their physiognomy - like Jack Palance, for example.  Jack Palance is incredible to look at."

Character overview
Raʼs al Ghul is an international criminal mastermind whose ultimate goal is a world in perfect environmental balance. He believes that the best way to achieve this balance is to eliminate most of humanity. Ra's usually tries to assault the world's human populace with a biological weapon, such as a genetically-engineered virus. He is aided in this quest by the Lazarus Pits, reservoirs of rejuvenating chemicals that restore the dead and dying to life; these pits have granted him a lifespan of several centuries. He regards Batman as his worthiest opponent, addressing him as "Detective" out of respect for his intellectual brilliance, and has frequently sought to make the Dark Knight his successor. He is one of the few criminals in Batman's rogues gallery to have deduced his secret identity as Bruce Wayne, but keeps silent on the matter due to the same sense of respect for Batman. For his own part, Batman's opposition to Raʼs is complicated by both his own respect for al Ghul's genius (if not his goals and methods) and his attraction to his daughter, Talia, which she reciprocates.

Fictional character biography

Origin
Ra's al Ghul's real name, early life, and exact age have been described differently by various writers. His Post-Crisis origin story is told in the graphic novel Batman: Birth of the Demon (1992) by Dennis O'Neil and Norm Breyfogle. This origin story is later revisited and amended in Batman Annual #26 (2007) by Peter Milligan and David López as part of the Batman: The Resurrection of Ra's al Ghul story arc. Most recent retelling origin story, Batman and Robin (vol. 2) #23.3 (2013) by James Tynion IV and Jeremy Haun, references these prior iterations of al Ghul's origin while keeping common details that lead towards Ra's' adoption of the moniker (e.g. Ra's' occupation as a physician, his wife's death, and the annihilation of the Sultan's city).

As told in Birth of the Demon, Ra's al Ghul (known only as The Physician prior to adopting the moniker) was born over 600 years before his first appearance in Batman comics, to a tribe of Chinese nomads settling in the desert in eastern North Africa, near a city governed by a Sultan. Developing an interest in the sciences at an early age, Ra's abandoned his tribe to live in the city, where he pursued life as a researcher. He subsequently became a physician and married a woman named Sora.

Ra's discovered the secret of the Lazarus Pit, and he saves a dying prince by lowering him into it. The prince, who is sadistic to begin with, is driven completely insane by the Lazarus Pit. He proceeds to strangle Sora, on whom he has already had his eye for some time. The Sultan, unwilling to admit to himself his son's culpability, declares Ra's guilty of the crime and sentences him to a slow, tortured death in a cage with Sora's corpse.

Ra's is set free by the son of a dying elderly woman, who Ra's had earlier examined. The son feels that he owes Ra's a debt for easing his mother's suffering during her last few hours. Ra's and the son head into the desert to seek the tribe of Ra's' birth. Ra's convinces the head of his tribe, his uncle, to follow Ra's in his quest for revenge by promising the downfall of the Sultan. By understanding the germ theory of disease hundreds of years before anyone else, Ra's is able to infect the prince with a deadly virus by sending him contaminated fabrics. When the Sultan comes to ask Ra's to cure the prince again, Ra's kills both him and his son. Ra's then leads his tribe to raze the city to the ground and kill all of its inhabitants. Subsequently, Ra's declares himself "Ra's al Ghul", the "Demon's Head".

Batman: Birth of the Demon provides a rough figure of 500 years for Ra's al Ghul's age. Due to living so long, he is assumed to have lost track of how old he is. Azrael #6 (July 1995; written by Dennis O'Neil) places Ra's age closer to 450 years. As he tells Jean Paul Valley, "I appear to be a vigorous fifty. I am actually a very vigorous four hundred and forty-eight...or is it four hundred and fifty-three? I lost count during the Black Plague. No matter". In Batman Annual #25 (published in 2006), Ra's al Ghul is described as a "700-Year Old International Terrorist". The 700 year plus mark is used again in Batman and Robin (vol. 2) #23.3 (2013), followed by Issue #30 of the same series where over a 1000-year time span is also described in Ra's' pursuit of Themyscira.

Using the Lazarus Pits to extend his life, Ra's spends the next several centuries journeying the world. He fights in the French Revolution and the Napoleonic Wars and becomes a formidable warrior. As the world entered the modern age and industrialisation began to cover much of the Earth, Ra's grew to despise the humans who he believed were destroying the world's natural beauty, thus setting him on a path of eco-terrorism. Also during this time, Ra's, his uncle, and Huwe, the son who freed Ra's from the Sultan's initial execution are all using the Lazarus Pits to prolong their lives until an incident in London. Ra's catches Huwe writing his own memoirs in their original Chinese language, of which Ra's has forbidden all records. During a battle, Ra's kills Huwe and flees to a Lazarus Pit, which he uses. When he returns to their home in London, his uncle has vanished with the remnants of their historical records.

Over time, he becomes a master of many forms of combat, notably fencing. He also builds up vast wealth and creates The Demon, a huge international organization. According to Justice League of America (1st series) #94:

The League of Assassins, one of the many smaller organizations making up The Demon, is thus sometimes called "The Demon's Fang" or "Demonfang".

Ra's al Ghul's ethnic origins may be described East Asian in accordance to Birth of the Demon and The Resurrection of Ra's al Ghul, and Byzantine/Eastern Roman as addressed by Talia al Ghul in Batman Annual #26. Ra's al Ghul's Eastern Roman background is further implied in Batman and Robin (vol. 2) #23.3. The significance of al Ghul's Eurasian profile is attributed to his known paternal heritage whilst his ambitions for world conquest is often compared and traced to the likes of Alexander the Great; an influence too shared by other family members such as Sensei (Batman #671 (2007) by Grant Morrison and Tony S. Daniel), Talia al Ghul, and Damian Wayne (Batman and Robin (vol. 2) #0 (2012) by Peter J. Tomasi and Patrick Gleason) (the name "Damian" being derivative of "damianos", Greek for "to tame"). Most commonly depicted in source material with a dominant phenotype of fair complexion, Ra's has also been able to opportunistically be involved in Western world global exploits such as the Age of Exploration (Year One: Batman/Ra's al Ghul #2 (2005) by Devin K. Grayson and Paul Gulacy) and the Third Reich (Batman: Death and the Maidens #5 (2004) by Greg Rucka and Klaus Janson). Ra's al Ghul's adoptive use of Arabic monikers and the language itself is a result of al Ghul's settlement and cultured history both in erudition and regional pursuit of Lazarus Pit/longevity sources most commonly unearthed throughout the Greater Middle East (e.g. The Well of Sins in the Arabian Peninsula, Red Hood and the Outlaws #22 (2013) by James Tynion IV and Julius Gopez) to East Asia (Peaches of Immortality, Year One: Batman/Ra's al Ghul #1). The use of Arabic monikers in particular (in regards to demons) is used as a scare tactic in Ra's' history promoting both his influence, and reign of terror throughout the Greater Middle East—his first eradication of a sultanate as described in Birth of the Demon, the same actions insinuated to have been repeated in Batman and Robin (vol. 2) #23.3, and direct depiction in Death and the Maidens #4.

Aligning with Ra's al Ghul's character overview as an international environmental terrorist, in conjunction with the character's background being subject to different renditions from multiple writers; co-creator of the character, Neal Adams, has stated that the character has no specific regional/ethnic representation of any kind, necessarily.

Contagion and legacy
Ra's returns to prominence and comes dangerously close to realizing his dream of worldwide genocide in the "Contagion" story arc of the Batman titles. His organization unleashes a deadly virus known as Ebola Gulf A (a.k.a. "The Clench") in Gotham City, putting Batman in conflict with a force he seemingly cannot defeat. A cure is eventually located by Batman and his allies, though the mastermind behind the outbreak is not discovered until the follow-up story "Legacy".

Learning that the Demon's Head still lives, Batman and his team circle the globe, preventing further outbreaks of the virus. Ra's allies himself with Bane, the man who once crippled and nearly killed Batman. Ra's considers Bane a potential heir to his empire, despite his daughter Talia's distaste for the criminal mastermind. Eventually, Batman deduces a way to eliminate the Clench virus from an ancient "Wheel of Plagues" artifact whose knowledge has aided Ra's in the creation of the disease. The long-lived madman eludes justice again.

JLA: Tower of Babel
In the "Tower of Babel" storyline, in JLA #43–46, Ra's discovers Batman's contingency plans for stopping the other members of the Justice League of America, should they turn or be turned evil, and uses them to try to destroy the group. Meanwhile, Ra's steals the bodies of Batman's parents. This theft prevents Batman from realizing Ra's is using his traps until it is too late, as he is distracted by the search for the corpses of his parents.

Though defeated, Ra's does cause the temporary exit of Batman from the JLA, who now distrust the Caped Crusader. However, though some of the League resent Batman's plans, they eventually accept that the plans were created for the right reasons once Batman confirms that he trusts them by revealing his secret identity to the rest of the team.

Talia, disillusioned with her father, leaves the League to run LexCorp for former U.S. President Lex Luthor, before selling the company to Bruce Wayne for his Wayne Foundation to aid Batman and Superman's victory over Luthor. Ra's blames Batman for his failed relationship with Talia, and stages a plot where he tries to separate Batman from his heir, Dick Grayson, shortly before Wayne officially adopts his former ward as his son. The plan fails, and Wayne and Grayson go ahead with the adoption.

Ra's is also featured in Birds of Prey #31–35, where he has a romantic fling with the Black Canary. The superheroine is injured and healed in the Lazarus Pit, which also restores the Canary Cry she lost years earlier.

Death and the Maidens
In Death and the Maidens (2004), Ra's' other daughter, Nyssa Raatko, furious at her father for abandoning her in a Nazi concentration camp during World War II, begins plotting to destroy him, prompting Ra's to contact Batman to make a deal for access to a Lazarus Pit to give him the strength for a final confrontation with Nyssa; in exchange for the location of a Pit, Ra's provides Batman with a serum that will allow him to walk in the spirit world and speak with his parents. While Batman experiences his "vision", Nyssa befriends Talia and then kidnaps and brainwashes her. Nyssa plots to destroy all hope and optimism in the world by assassinating Superman with Kryptonite bullets she steals from the Batcave. While Batman stops Nyssa from killing Superman, he is unable to stop her from mortally injuring her father. A dying Ra's reveals that this is all part of his greater plan to ensure that his daughters will realize that he is correct in his perceptions about the world and what needs to be done to it, and that they would come to accept their destinies as his heirs. Ra's' plan works: both Nyssa and Talia become the heads of The Demon and the League of Assassins. Talia disavows her love for Bruce Wayne, and both sisters declare Batman their enemy. It is too late for Ra's, as Nyssa stabs her father through the heart, seemingly killing him for good. To ensure Ra's will not return, Batman oversees his nemesis' cremation.

The Resurrection of Ra's al Ghul

In Batman Annual #26, Talia is prompted to read the history of Ra's al Ghul to her son Damian by a mysterious figure from Ra's' past: the White Ghost. Unbeknownst to her, the White Ghost plans to use Damian as a vessel for Ra's' return. However, mother and son escape before the plan is completed. After the escape, Batman confronts the White Ghost; he fights Batman, but accidentally falls into a Lazarus Pit.

As of Batman #670, Ra's al Ghul has returned, having evaded death by transferring his consciousness into the body of another. Because his host body is decaying from radiation poisoning, he needs to transfer his mind into another host body. His first choice is that of his grandson Damian Wayne, but Damian escapes to alert his father.

Upon taking Ra's to a "Fountain of Essence", which contains the qualities of a Lazarus Pit, Batman is confronted with the sight of the Sensei, who is revealed to be Ra's' father. After defeating Ra's, Sensei fights and impales Batman with a cane. Determined to win, Batman drags the Sensei into the Fountain, where he is killed for not being a pure soul. Ra's, meanwhile, has taken over the body of a Nanda Parbat monk and departs. Healed by the Fountain, Batman emerges and yells for Ra's.

Ra's attempts to make amends with Batman after his resurrection, but Batman responds by crushing his decaying fingers. Ra's accepts this latest rebuke and, with the help of his men, overpowers Batman and captures Damian, who has arrived to try to help his father. Ra's attempts to take over Damian, but Batman breaks free just as Robin, Talia, Alfred Pennyworth, and Nightwing arrive to save him. While the battle ensues at Nanda Parbat, the White Ghost takes Ra's to a secluded place, where he appears to accept the fact that his death is inevitable. The White Ghost is revealed as Ra's' estranged albino son Dusan, and offers up his own body instead. Ra's performs the transfer of souls, but the White Ghost apparently dies soon afterward. Ra's resumes the battle and attempts to kill Batman, but the monks at Nanda Parbat stop him and banish him from the temple.

Following his resurrection, Ra's al Ghul, in his new body, moves his base of operations to Gotham City where it is revealed that a remnant of his son Dusan's consciousness still remains within him. Since the White Ghost was his son, Ra's was able to use the resemblance between them to modify his new body's appearance to be more like his own. This arrogance contributes to the brazen move to Gotham and a subsequent ninja attack on Batman, which indirectly leads to the discovery of a map of all the known Lazarus Pit locations across the globe. Batman then infiltrates Ra's al Ghul's new Gotham penthouse headquarters and easily defeats his horde of ninjas and Ra's himself. To ensure Ra's is not a constant threat within Gotham City, Batman comes up with the false identity of "Terry Gene Kase", and plants it along with credible photos, medical records, and police records for both Blackgate Penitentiary and Arkham Asylum. Batman takes an unconscious Ra's directly to Arkham where it is believed he really is the prisoner "Terry Gene Kase", a criminal with multiple personality disorder who has just been transferred to Arkham to finish out multiple life sentences. Along with attaching false information and a false identity to Ra's al Ghul's file, Batman attaches a false prescription of potent medication that ensures slurred speech and next to zero mobility.

Despite these precautions, Ra's eventually escapes when the orderlies miss his dosage once, which allows him to become conscious enough to escape from Arkham.

The Return of Bruce Wayne
Ra's realizes that Batman has apparently died after Darkseid's invasion during Final Crisis. After confronting Nightwing with his knowledge, he and the hero eventually duel with swords. Nightwing defeats Ra's and earns the immortal's respect, signified by leaving his sword in the Batcave as a gift after their fight. Ra's refuses to believe his enemy's passing despite the evidence, leading him to be involved in the Red Robin's (Tim Drake) quest concerning the fate of the original Dark Knight. After Drake finds proof that Wayne is still alive but lost in time after his battle with Darkseid, the former Boy Wonder cripples Ra's' organization, the League of Assassins, from within. In response, Ra's returns to Gotham to begin his attack to destroy every legacy of the Wayne Family. While his men target everyone close to the Waynes, Ra's makes a pact with Hush as part of his plans. Unknown to both men, Lucius Fox has already given Tim power of attorney leaving him in control of the Wayne Family resources.

Enraged, Ra's then engages Tim Drake in combat, which ends with Tim mocking Ra's by saying that there's nothing he can do to harm the Bat Family anymore; in response, Ra's smiles and says "Well done. Detective" (a name he has only ever reserved for Batman, Nightwing and Red Hood once before). He then proceeds to kick him out of a skyscraper window and retreats from the battle. Later, in seclusion, Ra's reveals everything which happened was a test for Tim Drake, from the league, the council, the Men of Death, and the plot against Bruce Wayne.

Learning of Bruce Wayne's return, Ra's muses that his next confrontation with the detective will be particularly interesting as he believes that Batman has at last had a taste of the immortality that Ra's himself enjoys.

He goes after Vicki Vale and almost kills her. He spares her life only after she refuses to publish the identity of Batman and gets rid of all of the evidence she has to that effect. He also realizes that Vale may be a descendant of a French opponent, Marcel du Valliere, from centuries before; therefore, his business with her may not be finished.

The New 52
In The New 52 (a 2011 reboot of the DC Comics universe), Ra's al Ghul appears in a hooded robe at the League of Assassins' city of 'Eth Alth'eban. He enters the Well of Sins after an encounter with Jason Todd. When he emerges, Ra's is consumed by the evil that corrupted the Untitled centuries before, and he feels compelled to rid himself of the machinations of his daughter and Ducra by killing Jason. At Ra's' command, the prisoners are brought to him, and he promises to use his newfound power to destroy them. Red Hood engages Ra's, as Essence joins the battle. She insists that he will allow Jason and his friends to leave his realm, or he will be forced to die a mortal death just as he always feared he would. Despite having destroyed the All-Caste, Ra's al Ghul's actions have led to their eventual rebirth. Defeated, he swears that he will visit great agony upon Red Hood if he ever sees him again.

Batman and Aquaman head to an island, where the League of Assassins are located, after Ra's has the bodies of Damian Wayne and Talia exhumed. Ra's had ordered the hunt of whales, creating genetically altered super-humans in the wombs of sperm whales, part of a plan to rebuild the League of Assassins. Inside the compound, they find that Ra's is wiping the hard drives clean, preventing data recovery. As his parting gift, he has left Batman the Heretics to keep him entertained. Batman fights his way to Ra's escape aircraft. He sees Talia and Damian's bodies stored within it, and clings to the fuselage from outside as the plane takes off. Though Ra's plans to go to Paradise Island, he is nearly surprised to see Batman pounding on the cockpit's windshield. From outside, Batman screams for Ra's to give back his son, but Ra's responds that he is blood of Damian's blood and the boy is in good hands. He orders the plane to tilt its angle, causing the wind shear to rip Batman from his purchase and drop down into the sea, where he is caught by Aquaman.

Batman and Ra's then encounter Glorious Godfrey. Glorious Godfrey's reason to come to Earth is to retrieve the Chaos Shard, a powerful crystal once belonged to Darkseid which Ra's al Ghul revealed was hidden inside the sarcophagus he crafted for Damian.

During Batman Eternal, Bruce briefly speculates that Ra's is the mastermind behind most of the attacks against him that have left Wayne Enterprises bankrupt and Batman pushed to the limit. However, when he confronts Ra's, his foe reveals that, while he was invited to participate in the attack by the true mastermind, he rejected the offer as Ra's would prefer to destroy Batman when the Dark Knight believes that his legacy will be as eternal as Ra's, rather than tear him down in such a manner.

DC Rebirth

During DC Rebirth, Ra's al Ghul is featured in Detective Comics issues #953-956 as part of the "League of Shadows" story arc, which runs from issue #951-956 (April–July 2017).

Ra's al Ghul appears in Dark Nights: Metal issue #2 as a member of the Immortals, a group formed by the oldest beings in the multiverse. He participates in a discussion on how they will fight the Dark Multiverse invasion.

Abilities

Skills, training, and resources
Due to his expanded life span and longevity, Ra's has accumulated vast knowledge and abilities which exceed those of Batman. These include detective skills, chemistry, physics, military tactics, economics, and martial arts, fully using his photographic memory to master all such skills. He has also gained many international contacts and an immense fortune over the course of centuries. When in combat, he favors more ancient weaponry (as he has had more time to master them than more modern weaponry) these weapons include scimitars, katanas, spears, staffs, bolas, shurikens, smoke pellets and miniaturized explosives.

Ra's' greatest tools are his green Lazarus Pits, which heal any injury including recent death and restore the user to the prime of life, but cause temporary insanity (or for those already insane like the Joker, sanity). His constant exposure to the pits has granted him slightly enhanced endurance, strength, and healing but also comes with the price of a gradual onset of insanity if overused.

Magical and unnatural powers
Along with his physical abilities and resources, Ra's al Ghul has been shown to possess a certain degree of proficiency with mysticism. In an effort to guarantee his continued existence, he has on several occasions demonstrated the ability to transfer his soul into the bodies of others, giving him a way to live on in the event that his physical body is destroyed and unable to be transported into a Lazarus Pit. The exact details of this process have remained inconsistent; at times it appears as though a complicated ritual is required to achieve this effect, while on other occasions he is capable of performing this feat on a whim, merely by making physical contact with his intended host.

In the New 52, Ra's temporarily gained vast magical powers after bathing in the Well of Sins, the first Lazarus Pit. He claimed he was gifted with true immortality and displayed powers such as levitation, energy projection and construct creation and matter manipulation. However, he lost these abilities following his battle with Jason Todd.

Family
The following are members of Ra's al Ghul's family:

Sensei

Created by Neal Adams in 1968, the Sensei was originally introduced as high-ranking member of the League of Assassins. He was portrayed as an aged but highly skilled martial artist. During the Resurrection of Ra's al Ghul storyline, he was revealed to be Ra's al Ghul's centuries-old father. He dies during the same storyline.

Mother Soul

Created by Joshua Williamson and Gleb Melnikov in 2021, Mother Soul is the mysterious head of the League of Lazarus. In Robin (vol. 3) #7, she is revealed to be Ruh al Ghul (Soul of the Demon), Ra's al Ghul's mother.

Dusan al Ghul
Created by Peter Milligan and David Lopez in 2007, Dusan al Ghul was Ra's' only known son. He was also referred to as Ash'Shabah Al-Abyad, meaning "the White Ghost". Though little is known about his past, it is stated that he was born out of a union meant to strengthen his father's hold over "some long-extinct people", suggesting that he was older than Ra's' other children. As an albino, he was never considered a potential heir to his father's empire. He ultimately sacrificed himself to ensure his father's survival during the Resurrection of Ra's al Ghul storyline.

Nyssa Raatko

Created by Greg Rucka and Klaus Janson in 2003, Nyssa Raatko is Ra's al Ghul's oldest known daughter. She was born the only child to Ra's al Ghul's mistress Amina Raatko, also known as Lourdes in 18th century Russia. She would later become a Holocaust survivor. She is murdered by Cassandra Cain during the One Year Later storyline.

Talia al Ghul

Created by Dennis O'Neil and Bob Brown in 1971, Talia al Ghul is Ra's al Ghul's daughter. Talia's mother was a woman of mixed Chinese and Arab ancestry named Melisande, who met Ra's at the Woodstock festival.

Damian Wayne

Originally appearing as an unnamed infant in the 1987 graphic novel Batman: Son of the Demon, the character was introduced as Damian Wayne or Damian al Ghul (Arabic: دميان الغول) by Grant Morrison and Andy Kubert in 2006. Damian is the son of Bruce Wayne and Talia al Ghul, making him the grandson of Ra's al Ghul. He is an Heir to the Demon Head and expected to one day lead the League. Ra's raised him to be the new Alexander the Great. He is bred from birth to take and rule the world by his mother Talia al Ghul. He was very aggressive until he met his father, Batman. Batman taught him how to calm himself and trained him to be the new Robin. His genetic perfection and genetic makeup unfortunately marked him as the ideal host for his grandfather who wants to take over his body.

Mara al Ghul
Created by Benjamin Percy and Jonboy Meyers, the character debuted in Teen Titans (vol. 6) in December 2016. Mara al Ghul is a granddaughter of Ra's al Ghul, daughter to the late Dusan al Ghul and a cousin to Damian Wayne. Introduced as an enemy to Damian she was also raised by the League of Assassins. She and Damian were both members of the Demon's Fist, an elite group within in the League. Damian was supposed to lead the Demon's Fist but Mara now leads the group since Damian's choosing his father over the League. Mara hates Damian since he left her with a scar across her right eye during a training session when they were younger. Mara has not inherited her father's albinism; she has black hair with red bangs. Like the rest of her family, she is a skilled fighter and is also noted to be a talented artist.

Athanasia al Ghul
Athanasia al Ghul is a character featured in the Injustice 2 prequel comics and does not appear in the Prime Earth continuity. She is the daughter of Bruce Wayne and Talia al Ghul, sister of Damian Wayne and granddaughter of Ra's al Ghul. Athanasia is the secret daughter of Talia and Bruce and raised by Talia without Bruce or even Damian's knowledge. While Talia allowed Damian to become a hero and work with his father for a time, Talia kept Athanasia a secret from her father and raised her as a member of the League of Assassins. Athanasia is first seen beside her mother Talia breaking her brother Damian out of prison. She is insulted by Damian's apparent rudeness and wants him to say please before letting him out. When Warden Dan Turpin tries to arrest them she kills him and the guards. While exiting the building Damian tells his mother to control her 'servant', Athanasia, who then assaults him. It is only then that Talia reveals Athanasia is Damian's sister and the "Daughter of the Bat". After the fall of Superman's regime Athanasia and the rest of the League come out of hiding. She works alongside her mother and grandfather in a scheme to reclaim the Earth from humans who were destroying it. During a fight with Batman in their secret base in the Amazon Rainforest Athanasia was seemingly killed when El Diablo exploded and Athanasia wasn't shielded from the blast. She later appeared again alongside her grandfather in Gorilla City as King Solovar's guests.

Others
Although he fathered children with several women, Ra's al Ghul has only two confirmed marriages. The first was to Sora, whose death set Ra's on the path to becoming the "Demon's Head". The second was to Melisande, Talia's mother.

Ra's also appears to have an unnamed sister or half-sister, a female assassin belonging to a group called the "Daughters of Acheron", whose members share the same father. Another member is a woman using the alias "Promise". It is unclear if their common father, "Acheron", is in fact the Sensei (making them all Ra's' half-sisters) or if Ra's only has one half-sister on his mother's side.

In Batman and Robin #12, it is revealed that Talia has cloned her son, Damian. The clone is, therefore, a grandson of sorts of Ra's al Ghul. Additionally, Nyssa once stated that she has given birth twelve times (only two of her children, Daniel and Hannah, are named), opening the possibility of Ra's having many other descendants, although most of Nyssa's family are murdered by the Nazis and Nyssa believes that her great-grandson Vasily (a Russian soldier who is reported to have been killed in the Middle East) was the last of her line.

The Birth of the Demon features Ra's' uncle, who helps him avenge his wife and found the League of Assassins before they go their separate ways.

Involvement with Batman
After Talia encounters and falls in love with Batman in Detective Comics #411 (May 1971), Ra's begins to consider Batman as a possible heir. Ra's first deduces Batman's secret identity when he reasons the Dark Knight has to be rich, and learns only Bruce Wayne has bought the equipment a crime fighter would have; he is then ready to put Batman to a final test.

Ra's surprises Batman in the Batcave, seemingly to enlist Batman's aid in rescuing both Talia and Dick Grayson, the first Robin, both of whom have apparently been kidnapped. Batman soon discovers the whole affair is a charade orchestrated by Ra's to test Batman, which he passes. Ra's asks Batman to become his heir, which Batman refuses, appalled by his genocidal plan to "cleanse" the world. This story was later adapted into a two-part story in Batman: The Animated Series during its first season under the title "The Demon's Quest".

Despite being mortal enemies, Ra's al Ghul and Batman maintain some level of respect towards one another. Similar to The Riddler, Ra's admires Batman's intellectual prowess first and foremost, regularly referring to Batman as "Detective" or "The Detective" when speaking to or about him. Despite being aware of Batman's true identity as Bruce Wayne since their first meeting, Ra's has never exposed that information to the public or Batman's other foes; something Batman once attributed to Ra's' personal code of honor. However, Ra's has repeatedly used that knowledge to his own advantage when fomenting plans and contingencies against Batman.

In the story "Resurrection Night" in Batman #400, Ra's helps all of Batman's foes to escape from Arkham Asylum and the Gotham State Penitentiary, setting them on a plan to abduct certain individuals across Gotham City who are linked in one form or another to Batman. Ra's' true intent is to show Batman the folly of his efforts to protect a corrupt society which, to his mind, allows criminals to exist and flourish. Ra's eventually uses the Pit while still healthy, both increasing his strength and putting his life at risk, in an attempt to outmatch the Dark Knight. The plan backfires, as Ra's is left writhing in the pit, seemingly destroyed.

Other versions

Son of the Demon
In the graphic novel Son of the Demon, Ra's successfully enlists Batman's aid in defeating a rogue assassin and warlord, Qayin (a variation on the spelling of Cain), who has murdered Ra's' then-wife Melisande (Talia's mother). During this storyline, Batman marries Talia and she becomes pregnant. Batman is nearly killed protecting Talia from the assassin's agents. In the end, Talia ends her relationship with Batman, unwilling to put him in danger. She claims to have miscarried and the marriage is dissolved. The child is eventually born and left at an orphanage (eventually taking the name Ibn al Xu'ffasch). The only identification provided is Talia's jewel-encrusted necklace, which once belonged to Talia's mother. Two Elseworlds stories, Kingdom Come and Brotherhood of the Bat, feature two alternate versions of Ibn as an adult, coming to terms with his dual heritage. For a time, DC Comics' policy was that Son of the Demon was not canon and that Batman had no son. The recent appearance of the child (under the name Damian) in an issue of Batman implies that this policy may have changed.

31st century
Ra's has previously been revealed as alive in the 31st-century setting of the post-Zero Hour reboot Legion of Super-Heroes, impersonating Leland McCauley.

Superman & Batman: Generations
In the first Superman & Batman: Generations series, created by John Byrne, Bruce Wayne tracks down Ra's al Ghul after passing the Batman mantle on to his son. Ra's offers Bruce (whom he addresses as "Adversary") a chance at immortality. Ra's has determined that if two people enter the Lazarus Pit, the Pit will merge both life forces, destroying one soul in the process and imbuing the other with youth and immortality without the ensuing madness. With his only choices being a fifty-fifty chance at death in the Pit or being murdered by Ra's' men, Bruce agrees to the process. He survives exposure to the Pit and subsequently uses Ra's' criminal empire to clandestinely set up an international humanitarian network. He also becomes a near-immortal, aging one year for every century.

Spider-Man/Batman
In the Batman & Spider-Man: New Age Dawning crossover book (considered an Elseworlds story), Ra's begins plans for worldwide devastation. He manipulates the Kingpin to his side by infecting the crime lord's wife Vanessa with terminal disease and promising him the cure in return for his allegiance. Ra's then orders him to press the button on his machines which would send New York City under the ocean. Ultimately, Spider-Man and Batman interfere and the Kingpin reveals that he knows Ra's' plans and allows the two heroes to board his plane so they can assist him. Defeated, Ra's bows out of the plan gracefully but claims that there is no cure for the disease. Vanessa convinces her husband that she wishes no further violence, and they leave. Talia soon gives the cure to Batman, who then gives it to Spider-Man, who passes it on to the Kingpin.

The Batman Adventures
In The Batman Adventures #1, albeit Ra's didn't appear, he plays a larger role behind-the-scenes along the Society of Shadows and the Penguin. Ra's finally appears in issue #4, in which he fights Batman again only to be defeated by him one more time. Series writer Ty Templeton originally wanted to bring back Ra's in issue #5 depicting him at prison, but his script for the planned story was rejected because DC Comics told him and Dan Slott that they were 'done' with Ra's and it was time to move with other characters, resulting in issue #5 as a story of Black Mask's False Face Society.

Amalgam Comics
In the Amalgam Comics alternate dimension, Ra's is fused with Marvel Comics supervillain Apocalypse to become "Ra's Al-Pocalypse". Ra's' daughter Talia is fused with Lady Deathstrike to become "Lady Talia".

Earth-C
In Captain Carrot and the Final Ark, Ra's is parodied as Rash Al Paca, an alpaca who plans to save the environment from "animalkind" by increasing global warming and flooding the planet.

Kingdom Come
In Kingdom Come, a rogue superhuman claimed that Ra's al Ghul was killed. Ra's' grandson, Ibn al Xu'ffasch, is a member of Lex Luthor's Mankind Liberation Front. When the appearance of Gog threatens this reality, Ibn uses a Lazarus Pit to restore Ra's to life to try to find a solution in collaboration with Lex Luthor and Brainiac, but they fail to find a solution. All three of them attempt to betray Ibn, and Lex and Brainiac die in their own trap for him. Ra's gets into a sword duel with his grandson in the Batcave and is killed by him.

Flashpoint
In the alternate timeline of the Flashpoint event, Ra's al Ghul is a young boy and member of the H.I.V.E. council. He voted against using nuclear weapons to end the war in Western Europe between Aquaman and Wonder Woman.

Batman/Teenage Mutant Ninja Turtles
In the Batman/Teenage Mutant Ninja Turtles crossover miniseries, when the Foot Clan initially arrive in Gotham, Batman considers the possibility that they are a branch of the League of Assassins, but dismisses the idea as the Foot's combat skills show a focus on a specific area of martial arts as opposed to the more varied skills of the League. After Shredder attempts to escape a confrontation with Batman and the Turtles, he is confronted by Ra's, who offers him an alliance. With a batch of fresh mutagen brought to the DC Universe by Casey Jones, Shredder and Ra's try to bring the world to its knees by unleashing their mutated monstrosities (starting with the inmates of Arkham Asylum), but are defeated by the combined efforts of Batman, Ra's' own grandson Damian, the Teenage Mutant Ninja Turtles and Splinter, who force Ra's into flight.

Arrow
In the Arrow tie-in comic, Season 2.5, when he hears about terrorist group Onslaught and his leader Khem-Adam, Ra's wishes to speak with him. He sends Nyssa al Ghul and Sara Lance to retrieve him from his base in the Amon-Shu caves of Kahndaq. They arrive back, with him and a girl named Mesi Natifah. Wishing to give Mesi vengeance, he gives her his sword to execute him.

Batman '66
Ra's appears in a crossover story between Batman '66 and Wonder Woman '77 (taking place in the continuity of Adam West's portrayal of Batman and Lynda Carter's portrayal of Wonder Woman). He and his daughter Talia first meet Bruce in the 40s at a Wayne Foundation auction to support the war effort, where The League of Shadows and the Nazis attempt to bid for a book detailing ancient treasures and locations. When they confront the book's auction winner Mr. Finlay, the young Bruce and Talia escape with both of the books to keep them safe. Ra's finds Bruce in the maze and threatens his life, but Bruce escapes as Ra's manages to obtain one of the books.

Twenty-two years later, Talia hires Catwoman to steal the second book from Mr. Finlay. Batman, Robin and Catwoman travel to Paradise Island to warn Wonder Woman and her people that the League of Shadows will be invading one of the nearby areas, with Diana knowing that Ra's is after the island's Lazarus Pit. Ra's uses the pit to restore his youth and offers the four the chance to join the League of Shadows, but they refuse. Ra's tries to bury them alive, but they are saved thanks to the intervention of Wonder Girl and Talia rescuing them behind her father's back (still harboring feelings for Bruce). Talia is placed in prison by the Amazons while Ra's manages to escape.

11 years later, Catwoman aids Talia in escaping Paradise Island and the two Ghuls continue their search for Lazarus Pits. Thanks to spying on Wonder Woman and Batman, the League discovers there's a Pit in Gotham underneath Arkham Asylum. Ra's hires the Riddler, Mr. Freeze, Clayface, Killer Croc, and Cheetah to keep the heroes at bay. Batman follows Ra's near the Pit and tries to stop him, but Ra's uses his magical assassins to prevent them from interfering. Due to using the Pit sooner than the last time he used it, Ra's is de-aged into a ten year old. The two al Ghuls are taken by authorities, with Batman saddened that Talia chose to follow her father's influence.

Injustice 2
Ra's appears in the comic prequel series to the video game Injustice 2. After the fall of the Regime, he takes control of the Suicide Squad, using them to break out Damian Wayne out of Stryker's Island and kidnap the heads of large companies for execution, including Ted Kord. He also organizes the kidnapping of the relatives of active superheroes as a deterrent to their involvement in his plans and resurrects Alfred Pennyworth with one of his Lazarus Pits. Ra's' plan is eventually stopped when Batman and the remnants of the Insurgency, including Ted's successor as Blue Beetle Jaime Reyes, break into his base, inadvertently killing all endangered life he was protecting. As he leaves, Ra's reveals that he had ordered Jackson Hyde to attack the US congress, causing the deaths of thousands and damage to Batman's plans of rebuilding society. It is also revealed that he has been working with Solovar and has possession of the android Amazo. The war between him and Batman continues until he and Solovar are usurped by Gorilla Grodd. During Grodd's coup, he attempts to warn Bruce about the coup before he was mind controlled. As his last request, he asks Bruce to protect his grandchildren. Soon, Ra's appeared before Grodd and was killed by the new ruler of Gorilla City. Despite Ra's apparent death in the prequel comic, he appears alive in the games itself where he is featured in Black Adam's character ending.

In other media

Television

Animation
 Ra's al Ghul appears in media set in the DC Animated Universe (DCAU), voiced by David Warner.
 Ra's al Ghul appears in Batman: The Animated Series. This version has a son, Arkady Duvall (voiced by Malcolm McDowell), who in 1883 met and battled Jonah Hex. He was defeated and imprisoned for 50 years, in the process becoming unable to be healed by Lazarus Pits. In the present day, Ra's genuinely regrets abandoning Arkady, so Batman allows the two to spend time together before he dies.
 Ra's appeared in Superman: The Animated Series. In the episode "Knight Time", Robin mentions him as a suspect Batgirl and Nightwing thought responsible for Batman's disappearance. The episode "The Demon Reborn" reveals that Ra's is dying, as the Lazarus Pits have begun to lose their effect on him. He plots to siphon Superman's "life energy" via a Native American artifact to rejuvenate himself. He ultimately fails and dies, though Talia is able to revive him and the two escape.
 Ra's also appears in the Batman Beyond episode "Out of the Past". At some point prior to the original Batman's retirement, Talia assisted him in defeating Ra's in the "Near-Apocalypse of '09". This battle left Ra's with injuries too great for even the Lazarus Pit's healing capabilities to repair. As such, he transferred his mind into Talia's body, and manipulated the elderly Bruce Wayne into using the Lazarus Pit to restore his own youth before imprisoning Bruce in his mansion hideaway. Having modified the mind-transfer device to apply the transfer process to any host, he intends to take over his nemesis's body and take control of Wayne Enterprises. Ra's is thwarted by the new Batman (Terry McGinnis), and seemingly killed with the Lazarus Pit explodes.
 Ra's al Ghul appears in Batman: The Brave and the Bold, voiced by Peter Woodward. This version is interested in making Dick Grayson his heir instead of Batman or his own daughter. In the episode "Sidekicks Assemble", Ra's attempts to infect Coast City with mutated plants using his flying island, but he is stopped by Robin, Aqualad and Speedy. Ra's manages to get away with Talia al Ghul. He later makes a cameo appearance in the opening narration of the episode "The Siege of Starro!", where he and Ubu are foiled by Batman. Ra's' final appearance is in the episode "Crisis 22,300 Miles Above Earth" when he attempts to flood and "cleanse" the Earth by melting the polar ice caps. His plan and his army are stopped by Batman, the Justice League International and the Justice Society of America with help from Talia. Ra's is last seen falling into an abyss in the Himalayas after a fight with Batman.
 Ra's al Ghul appears in Young Justice, voiced by Oded Fehr. This version is a high-ranking member of the Light, Project Cadmus's board of directors. In the third season, titled Outsiders, Ra's has been dismissed from the Light and lost control of the League of Shadows to Deathstroke, but gains custody of the supposedly dead, now-amnesiac Jason Todd and the newborn Damian Wayne.
 Ra's al Ghul appears in Beware the Batman, voiced by Lance Reddick. This version attempts to manipulate Katana into killing Alfred to avenge her father Edogawa's death. She refuses, and Ra's prepares to kill both of them, only for Tobias Whale to arrive with a captured Batman. Batman breaks free and engages Ra's in combat, ultimately defeating him by using his weapon to release the vengeful spirits of his enemies, who drag him into a bottomless pit, presumably to his death.
 Ra's al Ghul appears in the DC Super Hero Girls episode "#LeagueOfShadows", voiced by Sendhil Ramamurthy, while Jason C. Miller performs his singing voice. This version is an evil rock singer who wants to eliminates all evil in the world, starting with bad music. He mind controls Kara Danvers/Supergirl using red kryptonite, but she is freed by Barry Allen, Garth, and Hal Jordan, and Ra's escapes.

Live action

Arrowverse

 Ra's al Ghul appears in the Arrowverse, portrayed by Matthew Nable. Liam Neeson expressed an interest in reprising his role from Batman Begins, but was unable to due to scheduling conflicts. This version also has a history with Batman prior to meeting Oliver Queen.
 The character first appears in season three of The CW's TV series Arrow, after being alluded to in the previous two seasons. Ra's al Ghul is portrayed as a moniker passed between successors. As the League of Assassins' leader, and the father of Nyssa al Ghul and Talia al Ghul, the current individual eventually approved the training for both Malcolm Merlyn and Sara Lance (The Canary). Ra's later seeks to kill Merlyn for breaking the League's code after leaving Nanda Parbat. In season three, Malcolm tries to get Ra's off his back by having his daughter Thea Queen kill Sara to manipulate Oliver Queen into confessing the murder to protect his half-sister and challenge Ra's to a trial by combat. Oliver is defeated by Ra's, but narrowly survives thanks to Tatsu Yamashiro, leading to Ra's deeming Oliver as his prophesied heir. After Oliver declines to take Ra's al Ghul's place, Ra's systematically attacks Oliver's home of Starling City to pressure him into taking the title on. Finally, Ra's mortally wounds Thea so that Oliver will have to come to Nanda Parbat and accept Ra's offer in exchange for healing Thea with the Lazarus Pit. Desperate to save Thea, Oliver agrees to train as the heir Al Sah-him. In the season finale, Ra's plans to unleash a bio weapon attack on Starling City so Oliver will not feel the pull of his former home. However, Oliver reveals still being loyal to his friends. With help from Nyssa, Oliver foils the plan and duels Ra's again, this time killing him. In exchange for helping him with the plot to take down Ra's, Oliver surrenders the Ra's al Ghul title and the League of Assassins' control to Malcolm. In season four, Malcolm and Nyssa start a League civil war when he uses the Lazarus Pit to revive her girlfriend Sara Lance, which corrupts her with bloodlust. Nyssa offers a cure for Thea's bloodlust in exchange for Oliver helping Nyssa overthrow Malcolm. Oliver duels Malcolm and defeats him. However, Nyssa declines the League's leadership and instead disbands it. In season five, Talia seeks revenge on Oliver for killing Ra's and works with Adrian Chase to do so. Talia and Nyssa battle on Lian Yu with Nyssa defeating Talia. 
 Ra's al Ghul reappears in Legends of Tomorrow. In the episode "Left Behind", Sara Lance returns to Nanda Parbat after being stranded in 1958. Two years later, the rest of the Legends team travel to Nanda Parbat to recover Sara, but she turns on them and has them apprehended. Rip Hunter challenges Ra's to a trial by combat with the two sides nominating Kendra Saunders and Sara as their champions. The duel is interrupted by an attack from temporal bounty hunter Chronos, who kills several League members. Ra's frees the Legends to preserve the League and after they defeat Chronos, he releases Sara from the League, deducing that she is from the future and was taught by the League of her period of time. Before leaving, Sara advises Ra's al Ghul to ensure that his unborn daughter, Nyssa, be at Lian Yu in 2008 (to locate Sara the first time).

Gotham

 Ra's al Ghul appears in the third and fourth seasons of Gotham, portrayed by Alexander Siddig. This version, in addition to leading the League of Assassins, is also tied to the Court of Owls, although he has his acolytes dispose of the Court once he is finished with them. In "Heroes Rise: Destiny Calling", Ra's al Ghul meets with Bruce Wayne, whom the Court's minions have brainwashed, and entreats the boy to become his heir. As a "final test", he orders Bruce to kill his butler Alfred Pennyworth. In "Heavydirtysoul", when Bruce stabs Alfred and snaps out of his conditioning, Ra's tells him to use the Lazarus Pit waters to save Alfred. He subsequently praises Bruce for his ability to resist, and says that he has not yet given up on turning Bruce into his heir. Ra's then disappears. In the fourth season, he tries to track down an ancient knife prophesied to be the only thing that can kill him. In the episode "A Dark Knight: The Blade's Path", he begs Bruce to stab him with the knife and end his suffering; when Bruce refuses, Ra's threatens to kill everyone he holds dear, goading Bruce into stabbing and apparently killing him. In the episode "A Dark Knight: To Our Deaths and Beyond", however, Ra's' loyal followers manage to resurrect him. Ra's then visits Bruce and Selina and reveals that he chose to live so he could mold Bruce into a "Dark Knight of Gotham" after he received a vision of a cataclysmic event soon to befall the city. In "One Bad Day", he forms an alliance with psychopathic criminal Jeremiah Valeska, who also has ambitions of "transforming" Gotham. In "No Man's Land", they destroy the bridges out of town, isolating Gotham from the rest of the world, but not before Ra's former lover and protégé Barbara Kean mortally wounds him with the dagger. As he dies, he tells Bruce that he must choose whether to remain simply Bruce Wayne or become Gotham's "Dark Knight". The episode "I Am Bane" had Bruce Wayne and Jim Gordon learning that Theresa Walker is Ra's al Ghul's daughter Nyssa.

Titans
In the Titans episode "Hank and Dove", Dawn asks if Ra's al Ghul brought Jason back from the dead by using the Lazarus Pit but Dick stated that he's in Khadym. In the episode "Lazarus", his sword is shown in Batman's trophy room in the Batcave. In the episode "Troubled Water", Gar reads one of Batman's journals and learns that Ra's al Ghul discovered the Lazarus Pit in Nepal and Syria.

Film

Live action

 Liam Neeson portrayed Ra's al Ghul in The Dark Knight Trilogy. 
 Ra's al Ghul first appears in Batman Begins with Ken Watanabe portrayed a decoy of the character. He is the head of the millennia-old League of Shadows organization based in the Himalayas that is dedicated to keeping order and justice in a world which it views as decadent and corrupt. During the film's first act, the character goes by "Henri Ducard", an apparent servant of his own decoy. Ra's acts as Bruce Wayne's mentor, teaching the stealth and martial arts training that his protégé will one day use as Batman. He orders Bruce to execute a murderer as a final test, but Bruce refuses and (desperate to prevent their plan to destroy Gotham) burns down the League of Shadows' temple. Bruce saves Ra's life while the decoy is killed by falling debris. During the film's climax, Ra's reveals his identity to Bruce, claiming to be immortal and that he is the mastermind behind many of the ills that have been plaguing Gotham City with his final plan being to disperse Jonathan Crane's fear-inducing toxin into Gotham's water supply. Finally, he reveals to Bruce that the League of Shadows had tried to destroy Gotham via an economic depression that indirectly resulted in the murders of Bruce's parents. In their final confrontation, Batman defeats Ra's and leaves him on a runaway train which crashes off a bridge and explodes, killing him.
 Ra's al Ghul next appears in The Dark Knight Rises. Josh Pence plays the character's young depiction in flashbacks set 30 years before the film's events. In an ancient part of the world, he was a mercenary who worked for a local warlord. He fell in love with the warlord's daughter whom he married in secret. When the warlord found out, the mercenary was condemned to a prison known as "The Pit". The daughter intervened on his behalf, so the warlord exiled him while sentencing the daughter to life in "The Pit". Unbeknownst to the mercenary, his wife was pregnant with his child. After his wife was killed in an attack by other prisoners, their daughter was rescued by Bane and later escaped from the Pit and went to find her father. Ra's turned the League of Shadows on the prison, killing several inmates and freeing Bane. But even after Bane saved Talia's life, Ra's saw Bane only as a reminder of where his wife died and so excommunicated Bane from the group. During the events of the film, Talia and Bane, having assumed leadership of the League of Shadows after her father's death, travel to Gotham to finish his work and avenge the death of Ra's, for which Batman is blamed and imprisoned in the Pit. Ra's appears in the Pit in a hallucination by Bruce, again claiming to be immortal and telling Bruce that an heir is carrying on the League of Shadows' mission to destroy Gotham. Recited in the Pit, the prevalent chant deshi basara is of the Moroccan language.

Animated
 Ra's al Ghul appears in Batman: Under the Red Hood, voiced by Jason Isaacs. This version is responsible for Jason Todd's resurrection after the Joker killed him. When Batman travels to his stronghold to question him, Ra's reveals that he had been planning to ruin Europe's economy by destroying its financial centers and had hired the Joker to provide Batman and Robin with a distraction. The Joker went rogue, however, and killed Robin. Plagued with guilt, Ra's resurrected Jason via the Lazarus Pit, but the boy was driven insane and returned to Gotham City as the murderous vigilante Red Hood, intent on taking revenge on the Joker. Ra's is last seen watching the news bulletin about the Red Hood's disappearance and the Joker's return to Arkham Asylum.
 Ra's al Ghul appears in Son of Batman, voiced by Giancarlo Esposito. This version is Damian Wayne's mentor and possible father-figure. During the film's beginning, he and Dusan al Ghul are victims of Deathstroke's takeover. Following his death, twelve-year-old Damian desperately attempts to submerge his grandfather into the Lazarus Pit, but Talia al Ghul states that the Lazarus Pit cannot save him, as his body was too damaged for its reviving ability.
 In Batman vs. Robin, he is mentioned by his grandson Damian, who says to his father that "Ra al Ghul was not much of a movie thrower". Later, Damian told Nightwing that Ra's had taught him everything he knew of personal combat.
 Ra's al Ghul appears to return in Justice League vs. Teen Titans, voiced by Terrence C. Carson. As a follow-up of Son of Batman, Damian encounters a demon claiming to be Ra's in Trigon's hellish realm, claiming that Trigon created the Lazarus Pits and that their usage would entail a price in the form of eternal servitude following the recipient's death. As a servant of Trigon, he shatters the crystal that Raven intends to use to re-imprison her own father. Robin, having bonded with Raven and the other four Teen Titans, attacks and kills the demon Ra's in Raven's defense.
 Ra's al Ghul appears in Batman vs. Teenage Mutant Ninja Turtles, voiced by Cas Anvar. He appears as a new partner of Shredder of the Foot Clan. During the fight at Ace Chemicals, Ra's al Ghul fights Leonardo who defeats him with a nerve move that Splinter taught him.
 Ra's al Ghul appears in the animated film Injustice, voiced by Faran Tahir.

Video games
 Ra's al Ghul appears in the 2003 video game Batman: Dark Tomorrow, voiced by Don Leslie.
 Ra's al Ghul/Henri Ducard appears in the Batman Begins video game, with Liam Neeson reprising his role from the film while the decoy is voiced by Fred Tatasciore.
 Ra's al Ghul appears in DC Universe Online.
 Ra's al Ghul appears in Gotham Knights, voiced by Navid Negahban. He ambushes Batman in the Batcave. While being beaten, Batman had no choice but to seal the Batcave and initiate it's self-destruct. Later, the Gotham Knights infiltrate the GCPD morgue to obtain Kirk Langstrom's DNA encryption key when they encounter Talia al Ghul who incinerates her father's corpse.

Lego series
 Ra's al Ghul appears as an unlockable character in Lego Batman: The Video Game.
 Ra's al Ghul appears in Lego Batman 2: DC Super Heroes, voiced by Steve Blum. He is a boss fight and unlockable character who is found at the North Metro Station.
 The Batman Begins version of Ra's al Ghul (as Henri Ducard) appears as a playable character in Lego Batman 3: Beyond Gotham via downloadable content.
 Ra's al Ghul appears in Lego DC Super-Villains, voiced by JB Blanc. His first and only appearance is in the second part of the level "The One With the T. rex Mech", when Batman, Joker and The Flash go to the temple to recruit him and Deathstroke after they wage their way through tons of League of Shadows ninja.

Batman: Arkham
Ra's al Ghul appears in the Batman: Arkham video games, voiced by Dee Bradley Baker.
 In Batman: Arkham Asylum, Ra's al Ghul's body can be found zipped up in a body bag in the morgue part of Arkham Mansion near Dr. Penny Young's office. His character bio is gained after scanning the body. If the player returns to the morgue later in the game after completing the main story, the body is gone, most likely taken by the League of Assassins to be resurrected.
 In Batman: Arkham City, after Batman is infected with the Joker's poisoned blood, he attempts to collect a sample of Ra's al Ghul's blood (which has regenerative capabilities) to find a cure. Heading to Wonder City's ruins, Batman and Ra's fight when the Dark Knight refuses to kill Ra's and take his place as the League of Assassins' leader. After a long battle, Batman eventually defeats Ra's and forcibly collects his blood, telling him that the Lazarus Pit has corrupted his mind and giving him one chance to end his crusade. Ra's is later revealed to be the power behind Arkham City's warden Hugo Strange, having seen the professor as a possible successor instead of Batman. He appears in Wonder Tower and kills Strange for failure when Protocol 10 was deactivated by Batman. However, the professor's dying breath activates Protocol 11 (a self-destruct protocol in Wonder Tower's command center). Saved from the explosion by Batman, Ra's (rather than be captured) stabs himself with his sword mid-fall before landing on Arkham City's gate. If the player returns to the gate later in the game after completing the main story, Ra's body is gone, and only his sword remains.
 In Batman: Arkham Knight, Ra's al Ghul's sword is placed in the GCPD evidence room prior to the game. Gotham's alleyways also have graffiti on them that says "The Demon's Head will return", likely written by the League of Assassins. Later, Ra's appears in a side mission "Shadow War", which is in a downloadable content (DLC) pack named "Season of Infamy" that was released in December 2015. While having survived his previous battle against the Dark Knight, Ra's is left sickly and barely clinging to life by having the remains of the Lazarus Pit constantly pumped into him. This weakening of Ra's inspires his daughter Nyssa Raatko to form a rebel faction of the League of Shadows to take control of the organization, resulting in a war breaking out between them and Ra's loyalists within Gotham. As this ultimately draws Batman's attention, he soon discovers Ra's hideout under Elliot Memorial Hospital, and learns of his deteriorating condition. Appealing to Batman's sense of morality, Ra's followers tell him of another, purer Lazarus Pit within Gotham, and ask to use it to heal Ra's. Upon finding the second Lazarus Pit, Batman returns to Elliot Memorial Hospital, talking with Alfred Pennyworth about options. After Alfred observes that Ra's has lived for so long already that denying him the Lazarus Pit is essentially allowing him to die of natural causes rather than actually "killing" him, Batman returns to the chamber where Ra's is being kept, where he has two choices: 
 Batman gives the Lazarus Pit sample to Ra's, and is forced to fight Nyssa and her rebels. Not soon after, Ra's regains his former strength and fatally slashes Nyssa for her treachery. Batman tries to fight him, but Ra's steals one of his smoke bombs and disappears. Batman comforts Nyssa in her dying moments and closes her eyes before he leaves.
 Batman decides against giving the Lazarus Pit sample to Ra's, and destroys the equipment keeping him alive. After he takes care of his loyalists, Nyssa arrives to see what her father has ultimately become. As she is about to strike him down, Batman stops her and says that he will take him to the GCPD. Nyssa is satisfied and lives up to her word, recalling all her forces from Gotham while Batman takes Ra's to a special cell at GCPD and straps him to a gurney, with Ra's telling the Dark Knight that he is proud of him for apparently breaking his code.

Injustice
 Ra's al Ghul appears as an unplayable support card in the iOS version of Injustice: Gods Among Us.
 Ra's al Ghul is alluded in Injustice 2. He is mentioned by several characters within the opening dialogue for matches, particularly if pitted against Damian Wayne. Ra's is briefly seen as part of Black Adam's ending. When Black Adam brings Isis' corpse to the Lazarus Pit following Brainiac's attack, Ra's blocks the way to prevent from doing so. Ra's offers Black Adam use of the Lazarus Pit, but they would help overthrow Superman's newly restored regime in return. Despite their differences, Black Adam agrees and the two begin their crusade against Superman.

Parodies
 Ra's al Ghul appears in Robot Chicken. In the episode "Password: Swordfish", Henri Ducard (voiced by Seth Green) trains Henry Heimlich to save people who are choking on food in a segment that parodies Batman Begins. Dee Bradley Baker later reprises his role from the Arkham video game franchise in the third DC Comics special. In the segment, Batman chases him down to the Lazarus Pit which Ra's uses to rejuvenate and be younger. However, Batman continuously kicks him, causing his age to regress into nothingness. Batman quickly leaves, not wanting anyone to know that he killed a baby.

Miscellaneous
 Ra's al Ghul appears in The Batman Adventures. He arrived to break up a fight between Batman and Sensei and even had to allow Sensei to go with Batman.
 Ra's al Ghul appears in the comic book tie-in to Young Justice. In issue 11, Ra's al Ghul oversaw the hijacking of the rocket at Cape Canaveral and had the original research payload replaced with a diamond lens that would turn sun beams into death beams that would attack the various cities. Batman and Robin end up fighting Ra's al Ghul which ended with Ra's falling off the tower to his death. Ubu and Talia were able to get Ra's back to Infinity Island where Sensei used the Lazarus Pit to revive Ra's al Ghul. After emerging from the Lazarus Pit, Ra's al Ghul ordered Sensei to prepare their weapon called the Serpent. In issue 12, Ra's al Ghul arrived where he found Sensei and Talia being attacked by Clayface and learned from Sensei that the monster was their operative Matt Hagen. After Ra's al Ghul stated to Clayface that he was still a member of the League of Shadows and commanded him to sleep, he ordered Sensei to ship Clayface to Gotham City for him to bother Batman and then demanded an explanation from Talia on how Clayface came to be.
 In Arrow tie-in comic The Dark Archer, it is revealed that Ra's al Ghul and his League had encounter with a similar organisation named "The Hidden" in 1985. They encountered Malcolm Merlyn (who will join them 9 years later) and Darius when searching for Ashkiri marker (in fact the entire mountain) in Hindu Kush mountains, but their vehicle was flipped in sandstorm and knocking out some members. Ra's punished an assassin for losing The Hidden. The member of The Hidden, Darius, is revealed as member of the League, acting as a double agent. Ra's and Darius went to enter Ashkiri temple to search for a Lazarus Pit and the hearts of snow leopard gods, while The Hidden wanted to protect the temple from them. In the same time, Lourdes (implied to be Nyssa's mother Amina Raatko) and Malcolm also entered the temple to seal the temple. Ra's and Darius found Lourdes attacked by Ashkiri gods after she was left behind by Malcolm. Ra's saved her, while Darius was killed by them, due to the need of a sacrifice. Lourdes became Ra's concubine until ten years later when she was saved by The Hidden, along with her son, Saracon.

Collected editions
His stories have been collected into a number of volumes:

 Batman: Tales of the Demon (1991), collecting the original 1970s Ra's al Ghul stories by Dennis O'Neil and Neal Adams
 Batman: Birth of the Demon (1992) by Dennis O'Neil and Norm Breyfogle, giving the origin of Ra's al Ghul
 JLA Vol. 7: Tower of Babel (2001), by Mark Waid, in which Ra's goes up against the Justice League of America
 Batman: Death and the Maidens (2004) by Greg Rucka and Klaus Janson, giving the ultimate death of Ra's al Ghul
 Year One: Batman – Ra's al Ghul (2005) by Devin K. Grayson and Paul Gulacy, which takes place a year after Ra's' death in Death And The Maidens
 Batman: The Resurrection of Ra's Al Ghul (2008) by Grant Morrison, Peter Milligan, Fabian Nicieza, and Paul Dini, chronicles Ra's al Ghul's resurrection.
 Batman Arkham: Ra's al Ghul (2019) by various, an anthology of stories featuring Ra's al Ghul from throughout the DC Universe.

See also
 List of Batman Family enemies
 Algol – The name Algol derives from the Arabic رأس الغول ra's al-ghūl. The English name "Demon's Head" is a direct translation of this, as Ra's is head, Ghoul is Demon.
 Eurasian nomads
 Alexander the Great
 Fu Manchu
 Secret society
 Terrorism
 Eternal youth
 Mandarin

Notes

References

External links

 Ra's al Ghul at DC Comics' official website
 https://web.archive.org/web/20110716115839/http://www.spider-bob.com/villains/dc/RasAlGhul.htm
 http://www.batmantas.com/cmp/ras.htm
 http://www.worldsfinestonline.com/WF/batman/btas/bios/rasalghul/
 https://web.archive.org/web/20051126221806/http://www.unstable.com/whoswho/rasalghu.htm
 http://www.worldsfinestonline.com/WF/superman/episodes/TheDemonReborn/

Action film villains
Villains in animated television series
Batman characters
Characters created by Dennis O'Neil
Characters created by Julius Schwartz
Characters created by Neal Adams
Comics characters introduced in 1971
DC Comics film characters
DC Comics male supervillains
DC Comics martial artists
DC Comics supervillains
DC Comics television characters
DC Comics characters who use magic
Fictional Arabs
Fictional alchemists
Fictional assassins in comics
Fictional blade and dart throwers
Fictional characters with absorption or parasitic abilities
Fictional characters with eidetic memory
Fictional characters with immortality
Fictional characters with slowed ageing
Fictional characters with spirit possession or body swapping abilities
Fictional crime bosses
Fictional cult leaders
Fictional dictators
Fictional eco-terrorists
Fictional martial arts trainers
Fictional detectives
Fictional mass murderers
Fictional necromancers
Fictional ninja
Fictional swordfighters in comics
Fictional terrorists
Fictional warlords
Fictional characters with energy-manipulation abilities
Fictional characters with elemental transmutation abilities
Male film villains
Video game bosses
Film supervillains